Microcarpaea is a genus of flowering plants belonging to the family Phrymaceae.

Its native range is Tropical and Subtropical Asia to Northeastern Australia.

Species
Species:

Microcarpaea agonis 
Microcarpaea minima

References

Phrymaceae
Lamiales genera